The Worlds of Shadow is a fantasy novel trilogy by American writer Lawrence Watt-Evans.  

There are three worlds in the story. There is a fantasy world where magic works and the planet is literally the centre of the universe, a science fiction world containing "faster than light" travel and blaster technology and finally the real world set in the present day.

This allows the story to combine elements of science fiction and fantasy.

Plot overview
Pel's world is in the midst of a war between two other worlds which is now spilling into his own world, but in each of the three worlds all the laws of physics are different. This series will take him and his family on a quest into the fantasy world, and his quest to regain what he has lost while finding a way home. This trilogy weaves sci-fi and fantasy, while keeping the two genres intertwined while independent.

Series
 Out of This World (1993)
 In the Empire of Shadow (1995)
 The Reign of the Brown Magician (1996)

Fantasy novel series